Joseph Michael Lombardo (born November 8, 1962) is an American politician and former law enforcement officer who has served as the 31st governor of Nevada since January 2023. A member of the Republican Party, he was the 17th sheriff of Clark County from 2015 to 2023.

Born in Japan, Lombardo moved to Las Vegas in 1976 and holds degrees from the University of Nevada, Las Vegas. He served in the United States Army before becoming an officer in the Las Vegas Metropolitan Police Department in 1988. He was elected sheriff in 2014 and reelected in 2018. He won the Republican nomination for governor of Nevada in 2022 and narrowly defeated incumbent Democratic governor Steve Sisolak in the general election.

Early life and education
The son of a United States Air Force veteran, Lombardo was born in Sapporo, Japan, on November 8, 1962. He lived in Japan for over a decade before moving to Las Vegas in 1976. Lombardo graduated from Rancho High School in 1980.

Lombardo attended the University of Nevada, Las Vegas, from which he received a bachelor of science in civil engineering and a master of science in crisis management. He also completed the 227th session of the FBI National Academy in 2006.

Early career

Military service 
Lombardo joined the United States Army after graduating from high school in 1980. During his time in the Army, he served in the Nevada National Guard and in the United States Army Reserve. He ended his military service in 1986.

Law enforcement career 
Lombardo joined the Las Vegas Metropolitan Police Department as an officer in 1988. He rose through the ranks, becoming a sergeant in 1996, a lieutenant in 2001, and a captain in 2006. He was promoted to assistant sheriff in 2011.

As assistant sheriff, Lombardo was in charge of the law enforcement services group, which included the department's divisions in charge of technical services, information technology, radio systems and professional standards.

Lombardo also sat on the board of directors of the LVMPD Foundation from 2007 to 2014. He retired from the police force after 26 years of service and stepped down from the foundation's board of directors in 2014 after being elected sheriff.

Lombardo had made appearances on the TV show Cops during the early 2000s.

Sheriff of Clark County

First term (2015–2019) 

On December 4, 2013, Lombardo announced his candidacy for sheriff of Clark County to succeed the retiring Doug Gillespie. He won the primary election and narrowly defeated the Democratic nominee, retired LVMPD captain Larry Burns, in the November 4 general election. Lombardo took office on January 5, 2015. As sheriff he was head of the Las Vegas Metropolitan Police Department, the combined law enforcement agency of Las Vegas and Clark County and Nevada's largest law enforcement agency, overseeing more than 5,000 officers.

After becoming sheriff, Lombardo began the decentralization of LVMPD's detective operations, shifting detective operations from centralized crime-specific units to distribution of detectives throughout LVMPD area commands.

In 2016, Lombardo connected the Las Vegas crime increase to a California law called Proposition 47, which is meant to reduce prison overcrowding. Later that year, he responded to questions about a recent spike of violent crimes in Las Vegas, saying that the surge "keeps me up at night". He later disagreed with FBI director James Comey's statement attributing a recent spike in violent crimes in Las Vegas to a so-called Ferguson effect. In December 2016, Lombardo supported a high-capacity magazine ban, a call supported by the Las Vegas Sun editorial board. By February 2017, Lombardo had concluded that the number of homicides in Las Vegas increased by an average of 20 each year.

In September 2017, following the arrest of Seattle Seahawks defensive end Michael Bennett in Las Vegas, Lombardo dismissed Bennett's allegations that two police officers who arrested him used excessive force and made vulgar threats, claiming video evidence of the arrest did not corroborate Bennett's allegations.

Following the 2017 Las Vegas shooting at Mandalay Bay and Route 91 Harvest, in which 59 people died and 527 were injured—the deadliest mass shooting in the modern U.S. history—Lombardo oversaw the investigation into the shooting and into the perpetrator, Stephen Paddock.

Second term (2019–2023) 

Lombardo won the 2018 primary election with 73% of the vote, defeating four challengers. He was sworn in to a second term on January 4, 2019, and during the ceremony touted an expansion of the LVMPD's staff levels during his tenure (an increase of more than 900 officers and 280 corrections officers). Later that year, Lombardo's department issued a report recommending many changes to improve the police response to future critical incidents.

During the George Floyd protests in mid-2020, the LVMPD arrested at least six people observing a protest along the Las Vegas Strip. Governor Steve Sisolak called for an investigation. Lombardo defended the department's actions by releasing body-cam videos of the six engaging in "antagonizing behavior" and obstructing officers.

As sheriff, Lombardo made an annual salary of $161,000.

In lieu of running for a third term, Lombardo ran for governor of Nevada in 2022. He was replaced by LVMPD undersheriff Kevin McMahill.

Governor of Nevada

2022 election 

Lombardo announced his candidacy for governor of Nevada on June 28, 2021, to challenge incumbent governor Steve Sisolak in the 2022 election. In the race Lombardo faced 11 other candidates, including presumed-frontrunner Dean Heller, a former U.S. Senator. However, Lombardo eventually surpassed Heller by double digits in the polls. By February, Lombardo was widely considered the frontrunner. Former President Donald Trump endorsed Lombardo in April 2022. Lombardo won the Republican nomination on June 14, 2022, with 38.3% of the vote, defeating Heller, Reno-based attorney and former boxer Joey Gilbert, North Las Vegas mayor John Jay Lee, and others. On November 12, 2022, several days after election day, Lombardo was projected to win, having defeated Sisolak by roughly 16,000 votes.

Tenure 
 
Lombardo was sworn in on January 2, 2023, the same day Cisco Aguilar became Nevada Secretary of State and Andy Matthews became Nevada State Controller. On his fourth day in office, Lombardo signed two executive orders to remove remaining COVID-19 mandates and address workforce vacancies and wages. On January 12, Lombardo signed two more executive orders aimed at reducing regulatory burdens. The orders would suspend any new regulations from executive agencies, with exceptions for regulations that would affect public health, public safety, pending judicial deadlines and the essential duties of an executive branch.

Assuming office during the 2022–23 winter season, Lombardo cited the inclement weather conditions to enforce motor carrier restrictions on the delivery of propane, calling it a "propane delivery emergency", and saying that it was to ensure "Nevadans have access to adequate propane supplies". On January 10, he ordered officials in Washoe, Carson, Douglas, Lyon and Storey counties to close all government offices after the Nevada Department of Transportation warned about dangerous road conditions along with worsening weather.

In his State of the State address on January 23, Lombardo proposed a two-year $11 billion budget that would be the largest general fund budget in Nevada history and pledged $2 billion per biennium for K-12 education—an increase of more than 22% from the previous biennium. He also promised to restore funding to the state's higher education system and proposed adding $313 million into what he announced as the "Nevada Way Fund", a savings fund to be used for infrastructure and development projects. On March 1, Lombardo signed legislation to transfer $70 million from the state's general fund to the education fund.

Personal life
Lombardo was divorced and has one child from his previous marriage. He married Donna Alderson, a commercial real estate broker, in 2015.

Lombardo is Catholic. In his spare time, he is an off-road racer in the SCORE International racing series.

Electoral history

See also 
List of U.S. state governors born outside the United States

References

External links

 Governor Joe Lombardo official government website
 Joe Lombardo for Governor campaign website

|-

|-

|-

|-

|-

 

 

1962 births
American gun control activists
American people of Italian descent
Living people
Nevada sheriffs
Politicians from Las Vegas
Republican Party governors of Nevada
University of Nevada, Las Vegas alumni